Alex Borimirov (born 13 May 1998) is a German-born Bulgarian footballer who  plays as a left winger. He is the son of former football player Daniel Borimirov who has played for Levski Sofia and TSV 1860 Munich.

Career
Alex Borimirov has started playing football at the young age of 8 years at the youth academy of football club PFC Levski Sofia.

Borimirov made his first team debut in a 4–0 First league with a home win over Vereya on 28 August 2016, coming on as a substitute for Añete.

Career statistics

Club

References

External links
 
 Profile in LevskiSofia.info

1998 births
Living people
Footballers from Munich
Bulgarian footballers
Bulgaria youth international footballers
German footballers
German people of Bulgarian descent
Association football midfielders
First Professional Football League (Bulgaria) players
PFC Levski Sofia players
FC Lokomotiv 1929 Sofia players
PFC Slavia Sofia players